Jodhpur Cantt railway station is a railway station in Jodhpur district, Rajasthan. Its code is JUCT. It serves Jodhpur city. The station consists of 2 platform. The platform is not well sheltered. It is located approximately 8 km from Jodhpur railway station. The railway station is under the administrative control of North Western Railway of Indian Railways.1 platform is under construction

Major trains 
Some of the important trains that run from Jodhpur Cantt are:
 Bilara–Jodhpur Passenger 
 Jodhpur–Bilara Passenger

References

Railway stations in Jodhpur district
Transport in Jodhpur
Jodhpur railway division
Buildings and structures in Jodhpur
Jodhpur